The following were the events of gymnastics for the year 2015 throughout the world.

Artistic gymnastics

 March 7 – September 20: 2015 Artistic Gymnastics World Cup, along with the World Challenge Cup 
 Note: The Tokyo World Cup is canceled for unknown reasons.
 March 7: AT&T American Cup at AT&T Stadium in  Arlington, Texas
 Men's all-around winner:  Oleh Vernyayev
 Women's all-around winner:  Simone Biles
 March 19 – 22: 39th Turnier der Meister World Challenge Cup 2015 in  Cottbus

 Both  and  won 2 gold and 3 overall medals each.
 March 25 – 27: World Challenge Cup #1 in  Doha

  and  won 2 gold medals each.  and Switzerland won 5 overall medals each.
 April 3 – 5: World Challenge Cup #2 in  Ljubljana

 The  won both the gold and overall medal tallies.
 May 1 – 3: World Challenge Cup #3 in  São Paulo

  won the gold medal tally.  won the overall medal tally.
 May 7 – 9: World Challenge Cup #4 in  Varna

  won the gold medal tally.  won the overall medal tally.
 May 21 – 24: World Challenge Cup #5 in  Anadia

  won both the gold and overall medal tallies.
 September 17 – 20: World Challenge Cup #6 (final) in  Osijek
  won both the gold and overall medal tallies.
 April 15 – 19: 2015 European Artistic Gymnastics Championships in  Montpellier

  won both the gold and overall medal tallies.
 July 31 – August 2: 2015 Asian Gymnastics Championships in  Hiroshima
 Men's Individual All-Around winner:  Ryohei Kato
 Men's Team All-Around winners: 
 Women's Individual All-Around winner:  Aiko Sugihara
 Women's Team All-Around winners: 
 October 24 – November 1: 2015 World Artistic Gymnastics Championships in  Glasgow
 The  won both the gold and overall medal tallies.

Rhythmic gymnastics
 March 26 – August 23: 2015 Rhythmic Gymnastics World Cup Series
 March 26 – 29: World Cup #1 in  Lisbon

  won both the gold and overall medal tallies.
 April 3 – 5: World Cup #2 (individual events only) in  Bucharest

  won all the gold and silver medals for this event, as well as the overall medal tally.
 April 10 – 12: World Cup #3 in  Pesaro

  won both the gold and overall medal tallies.
 May 22 – 24: World Cup #4 in  Tashkent

  won both the gold and overall medal tallies.
 August 7 – 9: World Cup #5 in  Budapest
  won both the gold and overall medal tallies.
 August 14 – 16: World Cup #6 in  Sofia
  won all the gold medals in this event and won the overall medal tally, too.
 August 21 – 23: World Cup #7 (final) in  Kazan
  won all the gold medals in this event and won the overall medal tally, too.
 April 29 – May 3: 2015 Rhythmic Gymnastics European Championships in  Minsk

  won the gold medal tally.  and Russia won 9 overall medals each.
 June 15 – 20: Part of the 2015 European Games in  Baku

  won both the gold and overall medal tallies.
 September 7 – 13: 2015 World Rhythmic Gymnastics Championships in  Stuttgart
  won both the gold and overall medal tallies.

Trampolining/Tumbling
 June 5 – October 31: 2015 Trampolining/Tumbling World Cup
 June 5 & 6: World Cup #1 in  Saint Petersburg
 Men's Individual Trampoline winner:  Tu Xiao
 Women's Individual Trampoline winner:  Li Dan
 Men's Synchronized Trampoline winners:  (Mikalai Kazak & Uladzislau Hancharou)
 Women's Synchronized Trampoline winners:  (Nadezhda Glebova & Susana Kochesok)
 Men's Individual Tumbling winner:  Meng Wenchao
 Women's Individual Tumbling winner:  Jia Fangfang
 September 11 & 12: World Cup #2 (trampoline events only) in  Valladolid
 Men's Individual Trampoline winner:  Gao Lei
 Women's Individual Trampoline winner:  Li Dan
 Men's Synchronized Trampoline winners:  (Sergei Azarian, Mikhail Melnik)
 Women's Synchronized Trampoline winners:  (Li Dan, Zhong Xingping)
 October 10 & 11: World Cup #3 in  Mouilleron-le-Captif
 Men's Individual Trampoline winner:  Gao Lei
 Women's Individual Trampoline winner:  Li Dan
 Men's Synchronized Trampoline winners:  (Masaki Ito, Yasuhiro Ueyama)
 Women's Synchronized Trampoline winners:  (Li Meng, Liu Lingling)
 Men's Individual Tumbling winner:  Greg Townley
 Women's Individual Tumbling winner:  Jia Fangfang
 October 30 & 31: World Cup #4 (final) in  Loulé
 Men's Individual Trampoline winner:  Uladzislau Hancharou
 Women's Individual Trampoline winner:  Tatsiana Piatrenia
 Men's Synchronized Trampoline winners:  (Allan Morante, Sébastien Martiny)
 Women's Synchronized Trampoline winners:  (Hanna Harchonak, Tatsiana Piatrenia)
 Men's Individual Tumbling winner:  Timofei Podust
 Women's Individual Tumbling winner:  Anna Korobeinikova
 November 25 – 29: 2015 Trampoline World Championships in  Odense
  won both the gold and overall medal tallies.

References

 
Gymnastics by year